Der Rufer is a bronze sculpture by Gerhard Marcks created in 1967. Casts of the original sculpture are located in Bremen, Berlin and Perth. The statue is of a barefooted man in a robe, cupping his hands to his mouth as if shouting.

The original commission in 1967 was for a statue outside a telecommunications building in Bremen.

In 1982, a version of the statue was presented to the Art Gallery of Western Australia in Perth by CSR Limited. The Perth statue was dedicated to victims and survivors of torture in 1998.

Shortly before the fall of the Berlin Wall, a cast of the statue was installed near the Brandenburg Gate in  Tiergarten in Berlin. The inscription contains a message of peace.

References

External links

 

Outdoor sculptures in Australia
Outdoor sculptures in Berlin
Sculptures of men in Australia
Sculptures of men in Germany
Statues in Australia
Statues in Germany
Tiergarten (park)
Perth, Western Australia